The Golden Eagles are an American basketball team that participates in The Basketball Tournament (TBT), an annual winner-take-all single-elimination tournament. The team first played in the tournament in 2016, was the runner-up in 2019, and won the championship (and $1 million prize) in 2020. The Golden Eagles' roster consists of professional basketball players who compete outside of the NBA, most of whom played college basketball for the Marquette Golden Eagles men's basketball team. The TBT team is an independent entity that was named after the college team.

History

2016: First tournament

The "Golden Eagles Alumni" were the No. 6 seed in the Midwest region.

Games

Players

 Maurice Acker
 Dwight Burke
 Dwight Buycks
 Joe Chapman
 Davante Gardner
 Marcus Jackson
 Darius Johnson-Odom

 Trent Lockett
 Jerel McNeal
 Derrick Wilson
 Jamil Wilson
 Wesley Matthews (coach)
 Travis Diener (asst. coach)

Source:

2017: Second tournament

The Golden Eagles were the No. 1 seed in the Midwest region.

Games

Players

 Maurice Acker
 Juan Anderson
 Lawrence Blackledge
 Dwight Burke
 Dwight Buycks
 Joe Chapman

 Davante Gardner
 Darius Johnson-Odom
 Trent Lockett
 Jerel McNeal
 Jamil Wilson
 Wesley Matthews (coach)
 Travis Diener (asst. coach)

Source:

2018: Final four appearance

The Golden Eagles were the No. 3 seed in the Northeast region.

Games

Players

 Maurice Acker
 Willie Atwood
 Lawrence Blackledge
 Cinmeon Bowers
 Elgin Cook
 Travis Diener

 Jerel McNeal
 Brett Prahl
 Jake Thomas
 Derrick Wilson
 Jamil Wilson
 Joe Chapman (coach)

Source:

2019: Title game appearance

The Golden Eagles were the No. 1 seed in the Wichita regional. By winning their region, the team received 25% of the region's ticket sales as a prize, which was $96,439.

Games

Players

 Maurice Acker
 Juan Anderson
 Lawrence Blackledge
 Cinmeon Bowers
 Dwight Buycks
 Mo Charlo
 Elgin Cook

 Travis Diener
 Jerel McNeal
 Andrew Rowsey
 Jake Thomas
 Jarvis Williams
 Derrick Wilson
 Jamil Wilson
 Joe Chapman (coach)

Source:

2020: Championship

The Golden Eagles were the No. 4 overall seed, in a field reduced to 24 teams due to the COVID-19 pandemic.

Games
The team received a first-round bye.

Players

 Maurice Acker
 Dwight Buycks
 Mo Charlo
 Elgin Cook
 Travis Diener
 Luke Fischer

 Darius Johnson-Odom
 Andrew Rowsey
 Jarvis Williams
 Derrick Wilson
 Jamil Wilson
 Joe Chapman (coach)

Source:

2021: Championship defense

The Golden Eagles were placed in the 16-team Illinois Regional as the top seed.

Games

Players

 Maurice Acker
 Sacar Anim
 Vander Blue
 Dwight Buycks
 Elgin Cook
 Travis Diener

 Luke Fischer
 Matt Lojeski
 Andrew Rowsey
 Jarvis Williams
 Derrick Wilson
 Jamil Wilson
 Joe Chapman (coach)

Source:

2022

For TBT 2022, the team was seeded no. 2 in the Dayton Regional.

Players

 Maurice Acker
 Sacar Anim
 Vander Blue
 Dwight Buycks
 Elgin Cook
 Travis Diener

 Luke Fischer
 Darius Johnson-Odom
 Diamond Stone
 Jarvis Williams
 Derrick Wilson
 Jamil Wilson
 Joe Chapman (coach)

Source:

Record by years

Through the 2020 tournament, Golden Eagles recorded the second-most number of victories of any team competing in TBT, after four-time champion Overseas Elite.

Awards

References

Further reading

External links 
 Team page

Basketball teams in the United States
The Basketball Tournament teams
Basketball teams established in 2016
Marquette Golden Eagles men's basketball